Emblemariopsis randalli, the Hornless blenny, is a species of chaenopsid blenny found in coral reefs around Cubagua, Venezuela, in the western central Atlantic ocean. It can reach a maximum length of  TL. This species feeds primarily on zooplankton. The specific name honours the ichthyologist John Ernest Randall who collected the type specimens and provided them to Fernando Cervigón for him to describe.

References
 Cervigón, F. 1965 (31 Dec.) Emblemariopsis randalli nov. sp. una nueva especie de Chaenopsidae de las costas de Venezuela. Novedades cientificas. Serie zoológica [Museo de Historia Natural La Salle]. No. 33: 1–4.

randalli
Fish described in 1965
Taxa named by Fernando Cervigón